The Golden Star Bank was North Korea's last bank in Europe.

History
It was established in 1982, located in Vienna, Austria, and owned by Taesong Bank. In 2003, the Austrian Interior Ministry released a report that claimed that the bank was engaging in espionage, "money-laundering, the distribution of forged currency and illegal trade with radioactive substances." The bank was closed in June 2004 amid suspicions of money laundering and the funding of North Korean arms, although there was not enough evidence to start a criminal trial. In a diplomatic cable that was later leaked on WikiLeaks, the United States Secretary of State expressed concerns that North Korea might be seeking to construct a replacement for the Golden Star Bank in Switzerland.

See also

Banco Delta Asia

References

Banks established in 1982
Banks disestablished in 2004
Banks of Austria
Defunct banks
Banks of North Korea
2004 disestablishments in Austria
Companies based in Vienna
Austrian companies established in 1982